Kurtenbach is a surname. Notable people with the surname include:

Al Kurtenbach (born 1934), American electrical engineer
Orland Kurtenbach (born 1936), Canadian ice hockey player and coach
Ron Kurtenbach (born 1943), American communist
Terry Kurtenbach (born 1963), Canadian-British ice hockey player